Melody Ding is an Associate Professor at the University of Sydney. Ding is an epidemiologist and population behavioural scientist in Sydney School of Public Health in the Faculty of Medicine and Health at the University of Sydney. She is also a member of the Charles Perkins Centre and the Sydney Southeast Asia Centre. Ding's research aims to improve population health through epidemiological research and behavioural change.

Career 

Melody Ding completed her undergraduate education in marine biology at Ocean University of China and her PhD through the Joint Doctoral Program in Public Health at the University of California San Diego and San Diego State University in 2012. She relocated to Australia for her postdoctoral research and is now a Senior Researcher at the University of Sydney.

Ding's research program lies at the intersection of lifestyles, physical activity, epidemiology, and chronic disease prevention and is devoted to generating policy-relevant research outcomes. She "aims to identify disease-causing risk factors, develop solutions for prevention, educate the public, and guide evidence-based policymaking." Ding expanded the field of lifestyle epidemiology by studying interactions among lifestyle risk factors and their impact on physical and mental health and longevity, including obesity, physical activity, sleep, social participation, retirement, and a vegetarian diet. Her research identified the combinations of physical activity, not smoking and active social participation as the strongest predictor for longevity. One facet of Ding's research is identifying changes that can be made to the built environment, such as making cities more 'walkable', to prevent chronic diseases, such as obesity and cardiovascular disease. Ding's research into the COVID-19 pandemic and physical activity has shown the effects of the pandemic varied around the world, potentially due to differences in infection control strategies between countries.

Since 2013, Melody has been awarded $2.5 million in research funding from the NHMRC, Heart Foundation, and other organisations. In 2021 Ding was awarded an NHMRC Investigator Grant – Emerging Leadership 2 and a NSW Health Cardiovascular Early-Mid Career Researcher Grant to design a decision-support tool for physical activity strategies.

Ding published the first-ever estimate for the global economic burden of physical inactivity, showing that inactivity cost healthcare systems $53 billion in 2013 and physical inactivity-related deaths cost the world $14 billion in productivity losses. This research also showed that a larger proportion of the economic burden is bourne by high income countries, whereas the low- and middle-income countries bear more of the disease burden.

Awards and prizes 

Ding's work on the global economic burden of physical inactivity has become one of the most frequently cited papers in physical activity and was recognised as one of the Most Impactful Publication in 2016 by American Heart Association. Ding has published over 160 peer reviewed papers and is one of the top two percent of researchers in her field according to a Stanford University study in 2022.

Ding has also been awarded:

 2021 The Ministerial Award for Rising Stars in Cardiovascular Research
 2019 Eureka Prize for Emerging Leader in Science
 2019 Homeward Bound Participant
 2018 Sydney Research Accelerator (SOAR) Fellowship
 2018 AIPS NSW Young Tall Poppy of the Year
 2017 University of Sydney Vice-Chancellor's Awards for Excellence: Outstanding Early Career Research

Media 

Ding has published in The Conversation on retirement, diet, risk for Alzheimer’s disease and diabetes, health impacts of sitting, and a Research Check assessing a reported potential link between nicotine and COVID-19. Her work has been covered in The Conversation, The Pulse, ABC News, SBS News and the SMH. Ding has provided expert commentary on physical activity on ABC Radio National, ABC News, BBC News and in the SMH and The Guardian, and has been profiled by The Lancet.

References 

Living people
Australian women scientists
Women medical researchers
University of California, San Diego alumni
San Diego State University alumni
Academic staff of the University of Sydney
Year of birth missing (living people)